Stovall may refer to:

Places:
 Stovall, Georgia
 Stovall, Mississippi
 Stovall, North Carolina, a town in North Carolina
 Stovall Drive, in Clovis, California
 Stovall House, historic home in Tampa, Florida
 Stovall's Inn, a Best Western hotel across the street from Disneyland in Anaheim, California
 Stovall Middle School, middle school in Houston, Texas
 Stovall Mill Covered Bridge, smallest covered bridge in the U.S. state of Georgia
 The Stovall, a high rise in Tampa, Florida
 24010 Stovall, an asteroid

People sharing the surname "Stovall":
 Anthony Stovall (born 1982), American professional soccer player
 Babe Stovall (1907–1974), American blues musician
 Carla Stovall (born 1957), Attorney General of Kansas 1995–2003
 Dale E. Stovall (born 1944), USAF Brigadier General
 Di Stovall (born 1947), American artist
 Dick Stovall (1922–1999), NFL football player
 Don Stovall (1913–1970), American jazz saxophonist
 Fred Stovall (1882–1958), oilman and baseball club owner
 George Stovall (1877–1951), American baseball player, manager of the Cleveland Naps, and player/manager of St. Louis Browns
 Gil Stovall (born 1986), American Olympic swimmer
 Jack Stovall, football coach for Central Connecticut State University
 Jerry Stovall (born 1941), professional football player and coach at LSU
 Jesse Stovall (1875–1955), professional baseball player
 Jim Stovall, blind author and advocate
 Lloyd Stovall, football coach for Southeastern Louisiana University
 Marcellus A. Stovall (1818–1895), American soldier and Confederate general
 Maurice Stovall (born 1985), American football player
 Paul Stovall (1948–1978), American professional basketball player
 Peter Simpson Stovall, State Treasurer of Mississippi (1912–1916)
 Queena Stovall (1888–1980), West Virginia folk artist known as the Grandma Moses of West Virginia
 Rawson Stovall (born 1972), video game producer
 The Stovall Sisters, a gospel trio, sisters Lillian, Joyce and Netta Stovall, members of the Blues Hall of Fame
 Thelma Stovall (1919–1994), Lieutenant Governor of Kentucky (1975–1979)
 Wallace Stovall, publisher of The Tampa Tribune
 William H. Stovall, a World War I flying ace
 J. Willis Stovall, paleontologist, who co-named Acrocanthosaurus
 William Shirley Stovall, Jr., commander of submarine 

Fictional characters:
 Lt. Stovall, character in the 1959 film Operation Petticoat
 Major Harvey Stovall, character in Twelve O'Clock High, a novel (1948), film (1949) and television series (1964-67)
 Red Stovall, character played by Clint Eastwood in the 1982 film Honkytonk Man
 Dewey Stovall character, played by Paul Brinegar, in the 1979-1980's TV Show "Dukes of Hazzard"
Victor Stovall is a character in MN Seeley's 2020 novel, "Cur Dogs."